New Prospect Church, also known as New Prospect Baptist Church, is a historic Baptist church located at 4445 Sheep Creek Road near Bedford, Bedford County, Virginia, United States. It was built in 1880, and is a one-story, wood-frame building painted white and in a vernacular Greek Revival style.  It measures 34 feet wide and 45 feet long, and has a low-pitched gable roof. The church has two entrances, one for the men and one for the women and children.

It was listed on the National Register of Historic Places in 2000.

References

Baptist churches in Virginia
Churches completed in 1880
Greek Revival church buildings in Virginia
19th-century Baptist churches in the United States
Churches in Bedford County, Virginia
Churches on the National Register of Historic Places in Virginia
National Register of Historic Places in Bedford County, Virginia
1880 establishments in Virginia